Hamgyong Province was one of the Eight Provinces of Korea during the Joseon Dynasty. Hamgyong was located in the northeast of Korea. The provincial capital was Hamhung.

Names
The province was first established as Yonggil (Yŏnggil) in 1413. It was renamed Hamgil three years later. In 1470, it was renamed Yongan (Yŏngan). In 1509, it was renamed Hamgyong after its two principal cities, Hamhung (Hamhŭng, "Complete Success") and Kyongsong (Kyŏngsŏng, "Mirror," "Clear," or "Perceptive City").

In the 18th century, this was transcribed via Chinese as Kyen-king and glossed as meaning "the Happy". In the 19th century, it was transcribed as Ham-kieng.

Within Korea, the province was also referred to by the regional name Dongbuk ("Northeast"). the southern half of the province was also referred as "Kwannam", the northern half of the province was also referred as "Kwanbuk".

History
Korea's northeastern frontier was first organized into the province of Yonggil in 1413.

In 1895, the province was replaced by the districts (bu) of Kyongsong in the northeast, Kapsan in the northwest, and Hamhŭng in the south.

In 1896, Kyŏngsŏng District was reorganized into North Hamgyŏng Province, and Kapsan and Hamhŭng Districts were reorganized into South Hamgyŏng Province. These divisions continue in present-day North Korea.

Geography
Hamgyŏng was bounded on the west by P'yŏngan, on the south by Hwanghae and Kangwŏn, on the east by the Sea of Japan, and on the north by Qing China and the Russian Empire.

See also
 Provinces of Korea
 Administrative circuit

References

Citations

Bibliography
 .
 .

External links
 Seoul City history article on Hanseong and 22 other late 19th-century districts (in Korean)

Provinces of Korea
Joseon dynasty